Partira is a small village in Crete. Belongs to Minoa Pediada municipality and it is located near Arkalochori in the regional unit of Heraklion. Its population is 100. The residents are engaged in rural work.

Populated places in Heraklion (regional unit)